John Filomeno "Percy" Rodriguez (5 January 1893 – 20 March 1917) was an Australian rules footballer who played with University and Melbourne in the Victorian Football League (VFL). Born in Broome, Western Australia.

He was killed in action at France during the Battle of the Somme.

Family
The second of ten children, and the eldest son of pearl fisherman and hotelier Filomeno Francisco "Francis" Rodriguez (1864-1943), and Maud Winifred Gwenevere Rodriguez (1877-1921), née Miller, John Filomeno Rodriguez was born at Broome, Western Australia on 5 January 1893; he was "the first white boy" to be born at Broome.

Education
Educated at Christian Brothers' College, Perth, and Xavier College, Melbourne.

Football
A champion schoolboy footballer at CBC, he was playing senior WAFL football while still at school.

Siblings
 Clarence Albert "Clarrie" Rodruiguez (1896-1952), footballer with West Perth Football Club, Subiaco Football Club, and the Claremont-Cottlesloe Football Club.
 Joseph Holland "Joe" Rodriguez (1894-1973), footballer with the Perth Football Club.
 Richard Patrick Gerald "Pat" Rodriguez (1900 – 1964), footballer with West Perth Football Club and Subiaco Football Club, coach of the Claremont-Cottlesloe Football Club, and administrator.
 Thomas Angelo "Tom" Rodriguez (1908-), footballer with the Claremont-Cottlesloe Football Club.
Percy and Joe played together for Perth before Percy left for Melbourne; Clarrie and Pat played together for both West Perth and Subiaco; and Clarrie and Tom played together for Claremont-Cottlesloe.

Perth (WAFL)
He played 31 games for the Perth Football Club in three seasons, 1910 to 1912, when, on the suggestion of the Perth captain (former Melbourne and University footballer Harry Cordner), he decided to move to Melbourne. He went to Xavier College (1913-1914); however, because he was too old (at 20) for Associated Public Schools' football, he coached at a junior level at the school.

University (VFL)
He played 17 games for University in the 1914 season.

Melbourne (VFL)
The university team withdrew from the VFL competition prior to the 1915 season; and, along with Claude Bryan, Jack Doubleday, Roy Park, he was cleared from University to Melbourne on 31 March 1915.

In May 1919, an unidentified former Melbourne footballer, wrote to the football correspondent of The Argus as follows:
"In 1914 the Melbourne football team, after its junction with the University, was a fine team, and succeeded in reaching the semi-finals.Out of this combination the following players enlisted and served at the front:—C. Lilley (seriously wounded), J. Hassett, H. Tomkins (severely wounded), J. Evans (seriously wounded), W. Hendrie, R. L. Park, J. Doubleday (died), A. Best, C. Burge (killed), C. (viz., A.) Williamson (killed), J. Brake, R. Lowell, E. Parsons (seriously wounded), A. M. Pearce (killed), F. Lugton (killed), A. George, C. Armstrong, P. Rodriguez (killed), J. Cannole (viz., Connole), A. Fraser (seriously wounded), T. Collins.These are all players of note, and in themselves would have formed a very fine side, but there is only one of them playing at the present time, viz., C. Lilley, who, as a matter of fact, takes the field under some disability owing to severe wounds which he received on service." – The Argus, 16 May 1919.

Military service
He enlisted in the First AIF in Melbourne on 1 June 1915 under the name of "Percy John Rodriguez". On 3 February 1917 he was promoted to the rank of Second Lieutenant.

Death
He was killed in action on 20 March 1917 during the Battle of the Somme. He has no known grave. His name is listed on the Villers–Bretonneux Australian National Memorial.
Football followers, particularly those connected with the University and Melbourne clubs, will regret to hear of the death in France of 2nd Lieutenant Percy Rodriguez, the former wing player of the two clubs mentioned. Coming from Western Australia, where. although young, he had already earned a reputation as a dashing player, he joined the University Club, and played with them until they withdrew from the league in 1914. In 1915 he played with Melbourne for a time before departing for the front. His dash and daring on the field, and his quiet, unassuming disposition when off, endeared him to all, and his many friends and admirers here will regret exceedingly that his career has been brought to a close all too soon. He was taking the dental course at the University before enlisting.The Daily News, 20 September 1917.

See also
 List of Victorian Football League players who died in active service

Footnotes

References

 Holmesby, Russell & Main, Jim (2007). The Encyclopedia of AFL Footballers. 7th ed. Melbourne: Bas Publishing.
 Main, J. & Allen, D., "Rodriguez, Percy", pp. 161–162 in Main, J. & Allen, D., Fallen – The Ultimate Heroes: Footballers Who Never Returned From War, Crown Content, (Melbourne), 2002.
 World War One Service Record: Second Lieutenant Percy John Rodriguez (4478), National Archives of Australia.
 Embarkation Roll: Percy John Rodriguez, Collection of the Australian War Memorial.
 Australia's Roll of Honor: 286th Casualty List: Killed in Action: Victoria: "Rodriguez, 2nd Lieut. P.J., Claremont", The Age, (Tuesday, 10 April 1917), p.6.
 Australian War Memorial Roll of Honour: Second Lieutenant Percy John Rodriguez (4478).
 Percy John Rodriguez, at Broome Anzacs.

External links
 
 
 Percy Rodriguez, at "DemonWiki".
 Second Lieutenant Percy John Rodriguez, Commonwealth War Graves Commission.
 Bronze Memorial Plaque for 2nd Lieutenant Percy John Rodriguez, First World War Poetry Digital Archive.

1893 births
1917 deaths
Australian people of Spanish descent
People from Broome, Western Australia
People educated at Christian Brothers' College, Perth
Australian rules footballers from Western Australia
People educated at Xavier College
University Football Club players
Melbourne Football Club players
Australian military personnel killed in World War I
Military personnel from Western Australia